Robert Fortet (1 May 1912, Boulazac, France – 3 July 1998, Paris) was a French mathematician working on analysis. His doctoral advisor was Maurice René Fréchet.

Fortet was a professor at the University of Caen and at the University of Paris. Some of his Ph.D. students in Paris were Egon Balas, Jyotiprasad Medhi and Jacques Neveu.

References

1912 births
1998 deaths
20th-century French mathematicians
Academic staff of the University of Paris
Academic staff of the University of Caen Normandy
Mathematical analysts
Probability theorists